San Marino Common Good is a centrist political and electoral alliance in San Marino, formed to contest the 2012 general election. It comprises
Sammarinese Christian Democratic Party (PDCS, Christian democratic), including also:
We Sammarineses (NS, centrist),
Party of Socialists and Democrats (PSD, social-democratic),
Popular Alliance (AP, liberal-centrist).

References

Defunct political party alliances in San Marino